Valhalla Memorial Park Cemetery is located at 10621 Victory Boulevard in North Hollywood and Burbank, California.

The cemetery has an entrance called the Portal of the Folded Wings Shrine to Aviation that is the final resting place for aviation pioneers—barnstormers, daredevils and sundry architects of aviation. It has memorials to Amelia Earhart and others, honoring their accomplishments.

Among those interred are celebrities from the entertainment industry.

The shrine, with a colorful tiled dome and female figures stretching their arms to the heavens, was built as the entrance to the cemetery. It was named for the hall of Odin, the Norse god of slain warriors.

Founding 
Valhalla was founded in 1923 by two Los Angeles financiers, John R. Osborne and C. C. Fitzpatrick. The Spanish Mission Revival entrance structure was designed by architect Kenneth McDonald Jr. For the decorative stone castings, McDonald hired Italian-born sculptor Federico A. Giorgi, who had created  statues of elephants and lions for the 1916 epic film Intolerance, and helped to craft the exterior of downtown's Million Dollar Theater. The gateway to the new cemetery cost $140,000.

The rotunda was dedicated March 1, 1925, with a concert by English contralto Maude Elliott. Picnickers spread blankets on the surrounding grassy expanse between three reflecting pools and flat cemetery markers, which were a new concept at the time. It became a tourist attraction and was used for concerts that were broadcast over radio station KELW by station owner Earl L. White. Just five months after the dedication, Osborne and Fitzpatrick were convicted of fraud. They had repeatedly sold the same burial plots—as many as 16 times—and netted a profit of $3–4 million, according to the Los Angeles Times. They were fined $12,000 each and sentenced to 10 years in prison, but served less than three years.

State control

The cemetery was taken over by the state of California. It is unclear how long the state owned the  cemetery, but Pierce Brothers bought it in 1950 and, within two years, closed the rotunda to vehicle traffic and moved the entry to the cemetery from Valhalla Drive in Burbank to Victory and Cahuenga boulevards in North Hollywood. There, they opened a two-story office building and mortuary.

On December 17, 1953—the 50th anniversary of Orville and Wilbur Wright's 12-second powered hop at Kitty Hawk—the rotunda was rededicated as the Portal of the Folded Wings, through the efforts of aviation fan and cemetery employee James Gillette. During the ceremony, the cremated remains of Walter R. Brookins, the first aviator to take a plane to an altitude of a mile and the Wright brothers' first civilian student, were interred.

When sculptor Giorgi died in 1963, he was buried outside the structure, near his masterpiece. Gillette was also buried outside, near the shrine he helped found.

The memorial was featured in Visiting... with Huell Howser Episode 426.

Earthquake
The cube-like shrine building was heavily damaged in the 1994 Northridge earthquake but restored and rededicated in 1996. Two years later, it was placed on the National Register of Historic Places.

Sale of property

In 1958, Pierce Brothers sold its family-owned chain of Southern California mortuaries and cemeteries to Texas financier Joe Allbritton, who sold  of Valhalla for development. In 1991, the cemeteries and mortuaries were acquired by Service Corp. International of Houston, but the Pierce Brothers sign remains at Valhalla.

Pioneers' resting place
Beneath the memorial tablets rest the remains of other aviation pioneers, including:
 Augustus Roy Knabenshue (1876–1960), who in 1904 became America's first dirigible pilot. He also founded a dirigible passenger service, from Pasadena to Los Angeles, in 1912.
 Evelyn "Bobbi" Trout (1906–2003), who held numerous records for endurance, mileage and altitude.
 James Floyd Smith (1884–1956), who built and flew his own plane in 1912 and invented the free-type manually operated parachute for the Army in 1918.
 Hilder Florentina Smith (1890–1977), who became a parachute jumper in 1914. Two years later, she became the first female pilot to fly out of the bean patch that later became Los Angeles International Airport. She was married to James Floyd Smith.
 Matilde Moisant, the second American woman to earn her pilot certificate—two days after her friend, journalist Harriet Quimby. In 1911, Moisant let Quimby be first, because Quimby needed the extra acclaim: She wrote about air races and the thrill of flight.
 John B. Moisant (1868–1910), who designed and built the first metal plane. Matilde Moisant was his sister.

Notable burials
Note: this is a partial list. Use the following alphabetical links to find a name.

A
 Fred Abbott (1874–1935), Major League Baseball player 
 Bert Acosta (1895–1954), aviation pioneer
 Eddie Acuff (1903–1956), actor
 Ernie Adams (1895–1947), actor
 Luis Alberni (1886–1962), actor
 Mary Alden (1883–1946), actress
 James Anderson (1921–1969), actor
 Harry Antrim (1884–1967), actor (unmarked)
 Johnny Arthur (1883–1951), actor
 Edwin August (1883–1964), actor, director, screenwriter

B
 Jill Banner (1946–1982), actress
 Lionel Belmore (1867–1953), actor, director
 Bea Benaderet (1906–1968), actress, voice actress
 Belle Bennett (1891–1932), actress
 Willie Best (1916–1962), actor
 Clem Bevans (1879–1963), actor
 John G. Blystone (1892–1938), director
 Stanley Blystone (1894–1956), actor
 Symona Boniface (1894–1950), actress 
 Al Bridge (1891–1957), actor
 Tyler Brooke (1886–1943), actor
 Walter Brookins (1889–1953), aviation pioneer
 Arthur Q. Bryan (1899–1959), actor, comedian, voice actor, radio personality
 Nana Bryant (1888–1955), actress
 Paul E. Burns (1881–1967), actor
 Frederick Burton (1871–1957), actor

C
 Georgia Caine (1876–1964), actress
 Elizabeth Caldwell  (1888–1970), silent screen actress 
 Brun Campbell (1884 –1952), musician
 Mark Mitchell Campbell (1897–1963), barnstormer, stuntman, Lockheed executive
 Yakima Canutt (1895–1986), actor, stuntman, director
 Jay Chamberlain, (1925–2001), racing driver (unmarked)
 Naomi Childers (1892–1964), actress
 Ken Christy (1894–1962), actor
 Mae Clarke (1910–1992), actress
 Chester Clute (1891–1956), actor
 Edmund Cobb (1892–1974), actor
 John Collum (1926–1962), actor
 Baldwin Cooke (1888–1953), actor and comedian
 Melville Cooper (1896–1973), actor
 Jim Corey (1883–1956), actor
 Gino Corrado (1893–1982), actor
 Aneta Corsaut (1933–1995), actress
 Jane Cowl (1883–1950), actress
 Richard Crane (1918–1969), actor
 Nick Cravat (1912–1994), actor and stuntman

D
 Richard Day (1896–1972), motion picture set designer
 Claudia Dell (1910–1977), showgirl and actress
 Joe DeRita (1909–1993), actor, comedian, member of the Three Stooges
 Don Dillaway (1903–1982), actor
 Douglass Dumbrille (1889–1974), film and TV actor
 Edna Dunkerley (1907–1990), Studio Nanny for Hal Roach Studios Little Rascals and Our Gang Comedies

E
 Warren S. Eaton (1891–1966), aviator
 Cliff Edwards (1895–1971), actor, singer, voice-over artist

F
 Morgan Farley (1898–1988), actor
 Franklyn Farnum (1878–1961), actor
 Eddie Firestone (1920–2007), actor

G
 Ceferino Garcia (1906–1981), boxer
 Gorgeous George (1915–1963), professional wrestler
 Gladys George (1904–1954), actress
 Lowell Gilmore (1906–1960), actor
 Leslie Goodwins (1899–1969), film director and screenwriter
 Lita Grey (1908–1995), actress and 2nd wife of Charlie Chaplin

H

 Oren W. Haglund (1905–1972), Production manager of eleven ABC/Warner Brothers television series from 1955 to 1961
 Jonathan Hale (1891–1966), actor
 Florence Halop (1923–1986), actress
 Lois Hamilton (1952–1999), model, author, actress, artist, aviator
 Mahlon Hamilton (1880–1960), actor
 Oliver Hardy (1892–1957), actor and comedian, partner of Stan Laurel 
 Leigh Harline (1907–1969), composer
 Colin Higgins (1941–1988), director & screenwriter

I
 Roger Imhof (1875–1958), actor

J
 Selmer Jackson (1888–1971), actor

K
 Fred Kelsey (1884–1961), pioneer actor
 Crauford Kent (1881–1953), actor
 Kathleen Key (1903–1954), actress
 Charles Criswell King (1907–1982), psychic known as The Amazing Criswell
 Bert Kinner (1882–1957), aviation pioneer
 Fuzzy Knight (1901–1976), actor
 June Knight (1913–1987), actress and dancer
 Theodore Kosloff (1882–1956), actor, choreographer, ballet dancer
 Paul Kruger (1895–1960), actor

L
 Frank Lackteen (1897–1968), actor
 Alice Lake (1895–1967), actress
 Sheldon Lewis (1868–1958), actor
 Robert Lowery (1913–1971), actor
 Sam Lufkin (1891–1952), actor
 James Luisi (1928–2002), actor

M

 Barton MacLane (1902–1969), actor
 Kermit Maynard (1897–1971), actor
 Sam McDaniel (1886–1962), actor and brother of performers Hattie McDaniel & Etta McDaniel
 Francis McDonald (1891–1968), actor
 George Melford (1877–1961), actor, director
 Bob Mizer (1922–1992), photographer
 John Moisant (1868–1910), aviation pioneer
 Matilde Moisant (1878–1964), pioneer aviator
 Mantan Moreland (1902–1973), actor
 Kay Morley (1920–2020), actress
 Mittie Morris (1874–1953), social reformer
 Mae Murray (1885–1965), actress

N
 Buddy Noonan (1937–1989), producer, The Roving Kind syndicated TV series
 Fayard Nicholas (1914–2006), actor and dancer

O
 Wheeler Oakman (1890–1949), actor

P
 Virginia Pearson (1886–1958), pioneering film actress
 Eddy Polo (1875–1961), actor, stuntman, the first to parachute off the Eiffel Tower

R
 "Slapsie Maxie" Rosenbloom (1904–1976), champion boxer, actor
 Gail Russell (1924–1961), actress

S
 Lewis Sargent (1903–1970), actor
 Charles Sellon (1870–1937), actor
 Eve Southern (1900–1972), actress
 Charles Stevens (1893–1964), actor (unmarked)
 Onslow Stevens (1902–1977), actor (unmarked)
 Madame Sul-Te-Wan (1873–1959), actress

T
 Charlie Taylor (1868–1956), aviation engineer
 Lyle Tayo (1889–1971), actress
 Alma Tell (1898–1937), actress
 Alice Terry (1900–1987), actress
 Roland Totheroh (1890–1967), cinematographer
 Lorna Thayer (1919–2005), actress

V
 Alberta Vaughn (1904–1992), actress
 Martha Vickers (1925–1971), actress and model
 Josef von Stroheim (1922–2002), sound editor (unmarked)

W
 Ken Weatherwax (1955–2014), actor 
 Rudd Weatherwax (1907–1985), animal trainer
 Bud Westmore (1918–1973), makeup artist 
 Alice White (1904–1983), actress
 Dave Willock (1909–1990), actor
 Henry Willson (1911–1978), talent agent
 Frederick Worlock (1886–1973), actor

Y
 Chief Yowlachie (1891–1966), Native American actor

See also
 List of cemeteries in the United States

References

External links
 The Portal of the Folded Wings Shrine to Aviation
 ]

 
Cemeteries in Los Angeles
Buildings and structures in the San Fernando Valley
History of the San Fernando Valley
Parks in the San Fernando Valley
North Hollywood, Los Angeles
1923 establishments in California